Bom Jesus do Norte is a municipality located in the Brazilian state of Espírito Santo. Its population was 9,962 (2020) and its area is 89.0 km².

References

Municipalities in Espírito Santo